Kasirabad (also Romanized as Kas̄īrābād) is a village in Miyan Darband Rural District, in the Central District of Kermanshah County, Kermanshah Province, Iran. At the 2006 census, its population was 28, in 4 families.

References 

Populated places in Kermanshah County